Matthew Nojimu Olanipekun Sadiku from the Prairie View A&M University, Cypress, TX was named Fellow of the Institute of Electrical and Electronics Engineers (IEEE) in 2013 for contributions to computational electromagnetics and engineering education.

References 

Fellow Members of the IEEE
Living people
Year of birth missing (living people)
African-American academics
Nigerian emigrants to the United States
African-American engineers
Prairie View A&M University people
Microwave engineers
American electrical engineers
Nigerian electrical engineers
Electrical engineering academics
21st-century African-American people